Barber House is a historic house located in Hopkins, South Carolina. It was built in 1880 and is significant for its architecture.  It was added to the National Register of Historic Places in 1986.

References

Houses on the National Register of Historic Places in South Carolina
Houses completed in 1880
African-American history of South Carolina
Houses in Richland County, South Carolina
National Register of Historic Places in Richland County, South Carolina